DNA-binding protein RFX2 is a protein that in humans is encoded by the RFX2 gene.

This gene is a member of the regulatory factor X gene family, which encodes transcription factors that contain a highly-conserved winged helix DNA binding domain. The protein encoded by this gene is structurally related to regulatory factors X1, X3, X4, and X5. It is a transcriptional activator that can bind DNA as a monomer or as a heterodimer with other RFX family members. This protein can bind to cis elements in the promoter of the IL-5 receptor alpha gene. Two transcript variants encoding different isoforms have been described for this gene, and both variants utilize alternative polyadenylation sites.

References

Further reading

External links 
 

Transcription factors